Husayni ( also spelled Husseini) is the name of a prominent Palestinian Arab clan formerly based in Jerusalem, which claims descent from Husayn ibn Ali (the son of Ali).

The Husaynis follow the Hanafi school of Sunni Islam, in contrast to the Shafi school followed by most of the Arab Muslim population of Palestine.

History

The Husaynis were a major force in rebelling against Muhammad Ali who governed Egypt and Palestine in defiance of the Ottoman Empire. This solidified a cooperative relationship with the returning Ottoman authority. The clan took part in fighting the Qaisi tribe in an alliance with a rural lord of the Jerusalem area Mustafa Abu Ghosh, who clashed with the tribe frequently. The feuds gradually occurred in the city between the clan and the Khalidis that led the Qaisis, however these conflicts dealt with city positions and not Qaisi-Yamani rivalry. The Husaynis later led opposition and propaganda movements against the Young Turks who controlled the Ottoman Empire.

By the time of the British Mandate the clan had hundreds of members and its several branches encompassed thousands. They were mostly concentrated in the Old City, however a large number of clan members also lived in the neighborhoods of Sheikh Jarrah, the German Colony, Katamon, Baka and Musrara. Several members of the clan were appointed to important political positions such as Mayor and Grand Mufti of Jerusalem. Musa al-Husayni was mayor of Jerusalem, 1918–1920. Mohammed Tahir al-Husayni was Grand Mufti of Jerusalem, 1860s-1908, followed by his son Kamil al-Husayni, 1908-1921, and then another son Mohammad Amin al-Husayni, 1921-1937. The main political rivals for the clan was the Nashashibi clan of Jerusalem, especially during the Mandate period. Before the formal commencement of the British Mandate, Musa and Amin al-Husayni incited the 1920 Palestine riots, resulting in many deaths. As a result, Musa was replaced as mayor by the head of the rival Nashashibi clan. Amin al-Husayni and Aref al-Aref were arrested, but when they were let out on bail they both escaped to Syria. A military court sentenced Amin in absentia to 10 years imprisonment, and he failed to qualify for a general amnesty in early 1921 because of his absence.

Unlike the Nashashibi clan, many Husayni clan members continued to lead opposition and propaganda movements against the British Mandate government and early Zionist immigrants. The clan founded and led many Palestinian Arab Islamist groups such as the Palestine Arab Party and the Arab Higher Committee. The clan was directly involved in disturbances including the 1920 Palestine riots and the 1936–1939 Arab revolt in Palestine. As a result of continuing disturbances and violence, the Arab Higher Committee was outlawed in October 1937 and Arab national leaders were rounded up by the British. One member of the clan, Amin al-Husayni, escaped arrest by fleeing to Syria. During World War II he went to Iraq then Iran and eventually to Italy and eventually arrived in Berlin. In Berlin, Amin al-Husayni was photographed with many important Nazi leaders including Adolf Hitler and Amin al-Husayni went to the Balkans on behalf of the Nazis to give speeches to recruits of the 13th Waffen SS division. Amin al-Husayni also broadcast pro-Axis statements into the Middle East on Nazi radio stations.

During 1947 Palestinian Civil War, the clan formed the Holy War Army led by Abd al-Qadir al-Husayni and Hasan Salama.  The force, described as the Husayni's "personal army", was set up and operated independently of the Arab Liberation Army set up at the same time by the Arab League. The Holy War Army was also active during the 1948 Arab-Israeli War and Abd al-Qadir al-Husayni died in combat on 8 April 1948 at Qastal.

After the 1948 War, most of the clan relocated to Jordan and the Gulf States. Many family heads that remained in the Old City and the northern neighborhoods of East Jerusalem fled due to hostilities with the Israeli government. Amin al-Husayni was politically active from Cairo. King Abdullah's  assassin was a member of an underground Palestinian organization led by Daoud al-Husayni.

The Orient House, which belonged to former mayor Musa al-Husayni is located in East Jerusalem.

List of notable members
Abd al-Qadir al-Husayni (1907–8 April 1948) – Palestinian nationalist fighter, founder and leader of the Holy War Army. (Son of Musa al-Husayni).
Adnan al-Husayni (1947-) – Director-General of Muslim Waqf which is responsible for Islamic religious sites in Jerusalem such as the Al-Aqsa Mosque and the Dome of the Rock.
Daoud al-Husayni – Inspector-General of the Army of the Holy War and aide of Amin al-Husayni. Co-founder of Palestine Liberation Organization.
Darwish al-Husayni – member of Arab Higher Committee.
Faysal al-Husayni (17 July 1940 – 31 May 2001) – founder and leader of Arab Studies Society, head of Fatah organization in West Bank and Palestinian Authority Minister for Jerusalem Affairs. (Son of Abd al-Qadir al-Husayni).
Hasan ibn Abd al-Latif al-Husayni – Mufti of Jerusalem (1781-1806/7).
Hatem Husseini (1940-1994) - Head of Palestinian Information Center in Washington DC, 1978-1982.
Hind al-Husayni (25 April 1916 – 13 September 1994) – former member of Palestine National Council and founder of orphanage for Palestinian children. (Cousin of Abd al-Qadir al-Husayni).
Hussein al-Husayni (unknown-1918) – Mayor of Jerusalem (1910–1917). (Son of Salim al-Husayni, brother of Musa al-Husayni).
Ishaq Hatem al-Husayni – author and president of Al-Quds University.
Jamal al-Husayni (1894-1982) – secretary to the Executive Committee of the Palestine Arab Congress and Supreme Muslim Council, founder of Palestine Arab Party and member of the Arab Higher Committee.
Kamil al-Husayni (23 February 1867 – 31 March 1921) – second Grand Mufti of Jerusalem (1908–1921, followed by his brother Mohammad Amin al-Husayni). (Son of Mohammed Taher al-Husayni; brother of Mohammad Amin al-Husayni).
Mohammad Amin al-Husayni (c. 1897–4 July 1974) – Palestinian nationalist leader, Grand Mufti of Jerusalem (1921–1948), founder of Army of the Holy War, leader of Arab Higher Committee.  (Son of Mohammed Taher al-Husayni; brother of Kamil al-Husayni).
Mohammed Tahir al-Husayni (1842–1908), full name: Mohammed Tahir Mustafa Tahir al-Husayni – Hanafi Mufti and Qadi (Chief Justice) of Jerusalem (1860s–1908), followed by his son Kamil al-Husayni in the similar position of Grand Mufti of Jerusalem).
Musa al-Husayni (1853–1934) – Mayor of Jerusalem (1918–1920) and Chairman of Palestinian Arab Action Committee. (Son of Salim al-Husayni, brother of Hussein al-Husayni).
Salim al-Husayni (unknown birth–1908) – Mayor of Jerusalem (1882-1897).
Serene al-Husayni (1920–2008) – major contributor to Palestinian costumes. (Daughter of Jamal al-Husayni).
Farouk Husseiny (2006-) - Member of the Husayni family.
Fares Husseiny (2009-) - member of the Husayni family and the brother of Farouk Husseiny.
Tewfiq al-Husayni – member of Arab Higher Committee.
Leila Shahid (1949-) – Palestinian envoy to European Commission. (Daughter of Serene al-Husayni).
Lena al-Husayni – Executive Director of the Arab American Family Support Center. (Great granddaughter of Aref al-Husayni, Sheikh of al-Haram al Sharif).
Rafiq al-Husayni, Chief of Staff of President Mahmoud Abbas.

See also
 Husseini
 Nashashibi

References

External links
Ilan Pappe: The Rise and Fall of the Husainis (Part I), Autumn 2000, Issue 10, Jerusalem Quarterly,
Ilan Pappe: The Husayni Family Faces New Challenges: Tanzimat, Young Turks, the Europeans and Zionism 1840-1922, (Part II) Winter-Spring 2001, Issue 11–12, Jerusalem Quarterly,
The Husseini Group

Husaynids

Palestinian Muslims
Families from Jerusalem